Jaycees Matriculation Higher Secondary School is a secondary school in the Sivanmalai area of Kangayam in Tamil Nadu state, India.

The school was established in 1981, and it is a private, unaided school located in Tirppur district of Tamil Nadu. It is co-educational and non-residential. There are 791 students and 52 teachers, along with 8 of non-teaching staff. The language of instruction is English.

History
Jaycees school was started by Jaycees Educational Trust in the year 1981 with a strength of 32 students and 2 teachers. This grew as Jaycees Matriculation School was recognized by the Govt. of Tamil Nadu in the year 1986. Later in 1995 the school became Jaycees Matriculation Higher Secondary School.
	
The medium of instruction is English and Tamil and Hindi are taught from 1st standard. The school also provides extra curricular activities in fields like computer languages, music, games, dance, moral instruction, drawing, karate, Silambam, band music, keyboard etc.,
	
Laboratories of physics, Chemistry, Botany, Zoology and Computer science are equipped with all the necessary apparatus and appliances. The library has different types of books that cater for the needs of students and teachers.	

High schools and secondary schools in Tamil Nadu
Tiruppur district
Educational institutions established in 1981
1981 establishments in Tamil Nadu